Peter Twumasi (born May 25, 1974) is a Ghanaian biochemist, author and professor at the Kwame Nkrumah University of Science and Technology. He is currently the director general of the National Sports Authority of Ghana.

He was the head of the Department of Biochemistry and Biotechnology, College of Science at KNUST.

Education 
Peter completed his undergraduate studies at the Kwame Nkrumah University of Science and Technology, where he obtained a bachelor's degree in biochemistry. He continued to pursue a master's degree and doctor of philosophy degree at Wageningen University and Research Centre in the Netherlands. Whilst in Wageningen University and Research, he developed an Apoptotic Model in Zinnia Plant Cell Culture System, which is today considered the best model for apoptotic and programmed cell death studies worldwide in animals and plants alike.

Career 
In 2007, he started his career path as a lecturer in the Kwame Nkrumah University of Science and Technology. He taught biochemistry in the university. In his years as a lecturer, he served as a senior lecturer, research fellow and visiting lecturer, head of the Department of Biochemistry and Biotechnology at KNUST from 2017 to 2019. He was appointed as the director general of the National Sports Authority by the president of Ghana in 2018.

Peter is a CV Raman Research Fellow in India; and as part of this he spent three months at the Amity University in Uttar Pradesh, India, as a visiting lecturer/researcher. His research focuses in areas of biochemistry, molecular biology, biotechnology, microbiology, health and environment, and sports have resulted in over 60 publications. He has successfully supervised several hundreds of undergraduate and postgraduate (master's and PhD) theses, with some outcomes published in scientific journals. He has written five books and tens of articles in dailies on science and society. His recent memoir entitled "Rising from the Farmhouse" was launched in 2019 by the Ghanaian vice president Dr Mahamudu Bawumia.

He initiated the Laboratory and Office Equipment Transfer Initiative (LOETI) Programme which attracted molecular, biotechnology and food science equipment worth GHS 593,544.00 for biochemistry and food science laboratories in 2009. Among the assorted advanced laboratory equipment included PCR machines, DNA sequences, centrifuges, rotary shakers, UV Spectrophotometers, DNA scanners, micropipettes, laminar flowhoods and chambers, etc. This significant contribution initiated advanced DNA and molecular research and teaching in the Department of Biochemistry and Biotechnology and other adjoining departments at KNUST. Today KNUST prides itself to be among global leaders in making contributions to globally new frontiers in molecular genetic and DNA research.

He is a member of the American Society for Microbiology (ASM), American Society of Plant Biologists (ASPB), Alumni Association for Graduates and Professionals of Wageningen University and Research. He was the Kumasi Branch President for the Ghana Science Association from 2011 to 2015 during which he initiated the famous GSA Kumasi Branch "One-day Research Seminar and Poster Presentations", which had its eighth edition held in April 2019 in Kumasi. He has always been an active member of GSA, supported the branch activities in diverse ways (including funding) and chaired a number of conference/poster sessions and press releases at both local and national meetings or conferences of GSA.

Political position and contribution 

 Chairman, Polling Agents Recruitment and Trailing Committee, NPP Ashanti Region in the 2020 Presidential and Parliamentary Elections
 Member of 2020 Ashanti Region Campaign Team
 Member of Ashanti Election Collation Team
 Member of National Research Standing Committee of the New Patriotic Party
 Member of Ashanti Regional Research Committee
 Research and Elections Officer in the Ashanti region
 Communication Officer for Oforikrom Constituency NPP
 Convener for NPP lecturers Group in the Kwame Nkrumah University of Science and Technology
 Secretary to the Nana Akufo-Addo Primaries Campaign in Ashanti Region with Hon Isaac Asiamah as Chairman
 Organizing Secretary of the KNUST NPP Branch and founding member of TESCON

Some achievement in sports as director general 

 Construction of 10 multipurpose stadiums and 65 Astroturf stadiums across the country

References 

Biochemists
Academic staff of Kwame Nkrumah University of Science and Technology
Living people
1974 births
Kwame Nkrumah University of Science and Technology alumni
Ghanaian chemists
Ghanaian scientists